Terror at Black Falls is a 1962 American Western film directed by Richard C. Sarafian.

Sarafian's directing debut, the film was shot in black and white in 1959 in Scotland, Arkansas and released in 1962.

The plot involves a Mexican gunman who seeks vengeance after a mob lynches his son for a horse theft he did not commit. He takes hostages in the town's saloon before being confronted by the sheriff. The film was criticized for its slow pace.  It was not successful at the box office.

Cast

References

External links
 

1962 films
American Western (genre) films
Films shot in Arkansas
1962 Western (genre) films
1962 directorial debut films
Films directed by Richard C. Sarafian
1960s English-language films
1960s American films